The University Gardens Seahawks are a semi-pro Puerto Rican football team based in Bayamon, Puerto Rico, competing in the Puerto Rico American Football League (PRAFL).

History

Founding

2015-Present

Club culture

University Gardens Irish

AFAPR Sub-23
It is the club's U-23 team that participates in the American Football League of Puerto Rico 2nd division of Puerto Rican American football league pyramid, its goal is to develop players with potential so that they can eventually make the jump to either the PRAFL team.

Achievements

Puerto Rico American Football League

PRAFL Championship
Winner (1): 2016
Runner-up (1): 2015

Record

Year-by-year

Puerto Rico American Football League teams
Sports in Bayamón, Puerto Rico